Vasilii Danilov (born December 13, 1988) is an Olympic swimmer freestyle and medley from Kyrgyzstan. He swam for the country at the 2004 and 2008 Olympics.

He also swam at the 2007 World Championships.

References

External links
 

1988 births
Living people
Kyrgyzstani male freestyle swimmers
Kyrgyzstani male medley swimmers
Olympic swimmers of Kyrgyzstan
Swimmers at the 2004 Summer Olympics
Swimmers at the 2008 Summer Olympics
Swimmers at the 2006 Asian Games
Swimmers at the 2010 Asian Games
Asian Games competitors for Kyrgyzstan
Kyrgyzstani people of Russian descent